Intimacy is a 1966 American film directed and produced by Victor Stoloff. It was shot in Birmingham, Alabama during two weeks in January 1965.

Plot

Businessman Walter Nicholson is at risk of bankruptcy and attempts to secure a lucrative business deal by blackmailing a key government employee, Jim Hawley, who is involved in the deal. Nicholson hires a freelance film creator to hide a secret camera in the hotel room of Hawley in the hope of catching him in a compromising position with local sex worker Carrie Lane. After getting drunk with anticipated excitement, Nicholson reviews the footage the morning after to find Hawley is actually having an affair with his own wife Barbara.

Cast
 Barry Sullivan as Walter Nicholson, a wealthy, corrupt businessman
 Joan Blackman as Barbara Nicholson, false-spouse to Walter Nicholson
 Jack Ging as Jim Hawley, a government employee
 Nancy Malone as Virginia Hawley, the alcoholic wife of Jim
 Jackie DeShannon as Carrie Lane, a local sex worker

Casting
Several months prior to filming, William Shatner was reported to have been signed to play the lead role. Later, Stuart Whitman was reported to star in the lead role, but left after a scene disagreement with Dana Wynter and was reportedly replaced by Fred Beir.

Blackman signed for the film in mid-December 1964. Local talent were auditioned for minor roles around the same time. Jack Ging was a late addition to the cast, having replaced Paul Richards a few weeks before filming started, while actress Madelyn Rhue was also originally set to star but was replaced shortly before filming.

Production

Pre-production
When reported in early 1964, the film was originally set to star actors Stuart Whitman, Dana Wynter, Cloris Leachman and Albert Salmi with an anticipated shooting time of just three days on a newly developed tape-plus-film process. Wynter reportedly walked off set after Whitman "blew the scene because the movie script wasn't working out the way it did on paper", although noted several months later that she hoped to still be involved, suggesting in July 1964 that plans were "just about ready" and including "the most delightful nude love scene". Before Birmingham was chosen as the filming location, director Stoloff also visited Montreal, Quebec to consider the possibility of using the city for exterior shots.

Filming
The film was shot in Birmingham, Alabama during two weeks in January 1965, although the only shot featuring the city is an exterior downtown shot at the start of the film. No mention is made to the filming location within the credits. Producer Stoloff and Jack Ging praised the local people in making them feel welcome. Filming primarily took place within the Clark Theater, which was converted into a two-room set. Local photographic brothers Ted and Vincent Saizis provided camera equipment. A Hollywood set construction crew arrived on December 22, 1964 to convert the stage for movie purposes. Filming wrapped around January 21, 1965 having began on January 6. The relatively short shooting schedule was attributed to having done rehearsals in Hollywood prior to filming on location commencing. The script was written by Eva Wolas, who had done a lot of script writing for the anthology series Playhouse 90.

Release
The film was released to theaters during May 1966.

Reception
Local reporter Emmett Weaver, writing for the Birmingham Post-Herald, regarded the film as being definitely for "adults only", primarily due to a single candid bedroom scene. While praising some dramatic performances from a well-known cast, Emmett felt the script was "contrived" although believed the film would be a financial success due to the low-cost of production. Film critic Colin Bennett, writing for The Age, considered the film as passable, with a clever script that "boasts an ingenious idea".

References

External links

Intimacy at TCMDB

1966 drama films
1960s English-language films
1960s American films
American drama films